Erik Keith Brann (born Rick Davis; August 11, 1950 – July 25, 2003), also known as Erik Braunn, was an American guitarist with the 1960s acid rock band Iron Butterfly. He was featured on the band's greatest hit, the 17-minute In-A-Gadda-Da-Vida (1968), recorded when he was 17.

Biography
A Boston, Massachusetts, native and a violinist, Brann was accepted as a child into the prodigy program at the Boston Symphony Orchestra, but was soon lured away to become a rock guitarist, joining first Paper Fortress, then Iron Butterfly at 17. He played with Ron Bushy, Lee Dorman and Doug Ingle from late 1967 to December 1969. The first album from this lineup, In-A-Gadda-Da-Vida, sold over 30 million copies, was awarded the first platinum award and stayed on the Billboard magazine charts for nearly three years. With arrangement assistance from Dorman, Brann wrote the song "Termination," which was featured on the album.

The album's mini-bio, written when he was 17, tells of an acting ambition he once had, clothing and food preference, and the ease with which rock 'n' roll artists were able to arrange sexual encounters (usually with groupies). It reads: "Although music has always been his one great love, Erik studied drama and before joining the Butterfly, his acting ability had landed him the lead role in a local play. ...Erik hopes to, one day, continue in the acting field. Right now, however, his only concern is the Iron Butterfly, turtleneck sweaters, bananas, and the fairer sex."

In 1970, Brann and  former Iron Butterfly member Darryl DeLoach formed Flintwhistle. This band performed live for about a year before breaking up. Between 1972 and 1973, Brann worked solely in the studio on various demos. In 1973, he recorded a couple of demos with MCA Records which can be found on bootleg sites. Notable songs from these demos include early versions of "Hard Miseree," "Am I Down," and "Scorching Beauty."

In 1974, he was contacted by a promoter about reforming Iron Butterfly, so he reunited with Ron Bushy to form a new version of the group, signing with MCA. The 1975 LP Scorching Beauty featured Brann on guitars and vocals, Bushy on drums, Philip Taylor Kramer (Bushy's friend) on bass, and Erik's friend Howard Reitzes (who worked in a music store frequented by Brann) on keyboards. The band also released Sun and Steel in late 1975 with Bill DeMartines replacing Reitzes on keyboards. Neither album sold well and the band disbanded shortly afterward (around summer 1977).

Between 1979 and 1990, Brann occasionally reunited with Iron Butterfly for concerts. He died in 2003 of a cardiac arrest related to a birth defect that he had struggled with for years, and was the first member of the In-A-Gadda-Da-Vida lineup to have died, followed by Lee Dorman and Ron Bushy in 2012 and 2021 respectively.

Discography

Iron Butterfly (1967-1969, 1974-1977)

 In-A-Gadda-Da-Vida (1968)
 Ball (1969)
 Live (1970)
 Evolution: The Best of Iron Butterfly (1971)
 Star Collection (1973)
 Scorching Beauty (1975)
 Sun and Steel (1976)
 Rare Flight (1988)
 Light & Heavy: The Best of Iron Butterfly (1993)

References

External links
The Official Erik Brann Website
Critical comment on In-A-Gadda-Da-Vida

1950 births
2003 deaths
American rock guitarists
American male guitarists
Musicians from Boston
Iron Butterfly members
20th-century American guitarists
People from Pekin, Illinois
Guitarists from Massachusetts
20th-century American male musicians